Stylocephaloidea is a superfamily of parasitic alveolates of the phylum Apicomplexia

Taxonomy

There are two families in this taxon.

History

This superfamily was established by Clopton in 2009.

Description

Species in this taxon infect insects.

Syzygy is frontal or frontolateral.

The gametocysts form an epicyst (ectocyst).

The epicyst may rupture or dissolve.

The sporocysts are released either singly or in chains.

References

Conoidasida
SAR supergroup superfamilies